Manvendra Pratap Singh is an Indian politician from the Bharatiya Janata Party and is currently serving as a Member of Legislative Council (MLC) from Agra Graduates constituency, Uttar Pradesh. He is also a member of National Monitoring Committee for Minorities Education (NMCME), Ministry of Education, Government of India.

Early life and education 
Manvendra was born on 21 February 1972 in Daudpur village of Aligarh, Uttar Pradesh. He completed his post graduation from Dr. Bhimrao Ambedkar University, Agra. He started his career as a RSS swayamsevak at a very early age. In 1989 when terrorism was at its peak in Kashmir many Kashmiri Pandits were killed by the terrorists on the basis of communalism the Indian flag was also burned in Kashmir due to this situation in 1992 students from all over the country marched at Lal Chowk to host the Indian flag in Kashmir. This inspired him to join that union of students ABVP in 1992. He worked in ABVP for many years and was elected unopposed the State President of Western Uttar Pradesh. His father was also a supporter of Bharatiya Jana Sangh which later became Bharatiya Janata Party. He joined BJP in 2013. He worked in BJP for many years and in 2018 he was nominated as Vice President of Braj Kshetra, Uttar Pradesh BJP. In 2020 he was nominated as candidate for legislative council elections from Agra Graduate seat, which is one of the largest constituencies in Uttar Pradesh.

Positions held 
Vice President of Braj Kshetra, Bharatiya Janata Party, Uttar Pradesh
State President of ABVP, Western Uttar Pradesh

See also
 Agra (Graduates constituency)

External links 
UP Vidhan Parishad official website
Vidhan Parishad Proceedings

References 

1972 births
Living people
Politicians from Aligarh
Politicians from Agra
Uttar Pradesh politicians
People from Aligarh
People from Aligarh district
Bharatiya Janata Party politicians from Uttar Pradesh
Members of the Uttar Pradesh Legislative Council